is a Japanese actor. He is represented with Horipro.

Biography
In 1997, Maeda joined as a first generation member of the Horipro Improvement Academy.  In 2003, he became a Terebi Senshi in the NHK Educational TV series Tensai terebi-kun Max for three years.

In 2007, Maeda moved to Horipro.  In 2008, he made his first starring role when he played Keiichi Maebara in the film Higurashi no Naku Koro ni. Maeda later played the same role in its sequel Higurashi no Naku Koro ni Chikai in 2009.  In 2010, he made his stage debut when he played the leading role in Byakkotai the Idol.

Filmography

TV dramas

Films

Stage

Variety

Other TV programmes

Advertisements

Internet

Dramas

Music videos

Short films

Magazine serials

References

External links
Official profile 
 

Japanese male child actors
Horipro artists
Male actors from Kanagawa Prefecture
1991 births
Living people